Mihailo Stevanović (April 3, 1903 – January 14, 1991) was a Serbian linguist and philologist, professor at the University of Belgrade and a full member of the Serbian Academy of Sciences and Arts.

Biography
He was born in Stijena Piperska. He was one of the signatories of the Novi Sad agreement on joint Serbo-Croatian language in 1954. He published more than 600 works, including the monumental two-volume Savremeni srpskohrvatski jezik: gramatički sistemi i književnojezička norma ("The modern Serbo-Croatian language: grammatical systems and the literary language norm"; Belgrade, 1964–1969). As an editor he collaborated on the development of numerous important dictionaries: Rečnik srpkohrvatskoga književnog jezika ("The dictionary of the Serbo-Croatian literary language"; Matica srpska, 1967–1976), Rečnik srpskohrvatskog književnog i narodnog jezika ("The dictionary of the Serbo-Croatian literary and vernacular language; SANU, 1959-), Rečnik Njegoševa jezika ("The dictionary of Njegoš' language"; Belgrade, Cetinje, 1983). Together with Ljudevit Jonke he co-edited the first joint Serbian and Croatian orthography book (Novi Sad - Zagreb, 1960).

Stevanović also edited journals Srpski dijalektološki zbornik, Južnoslovenski filolog and Naš jezik. He was a full professor (since 1951) and the head of the Department of South Slavic languages and General Linguistics, at the Faculty of Philosophy in Belgrade. In 1958 he was elected a corresponding member of the Serbian Academy of Sciences and Arts, becoming a full member in 1963. He also served as a director of the Serbo-Croatian Language Institute (1963–1973).

He was awarded the Seventh of July Award in 1973, Vuk's Award in 1987, Order of Labor of the first order in 1960, and National Service Medal with Gold Star in 1964.

He died in Belgrade.

References

Linguists from Serbia
1903 births
1991 deaths
20th-century linguists